Palting is a municipality in the district of Braunau am Inn in the Austrian state of Upper Austria.

Geography
Palting lies in the Innviertel. About 18 percent of the municipality is forest and 75 percent farmland.

References

Cities and towns in Braunau am Inn District